DXSD (101.3 FM), broadcasting as Radyo Natin 101.3, is an FM radio station owned and operated by Manila Broadcasting Company. Its studios and transmitter are located along Zambrano St., Brgy. Kalawag 2, Isulan, Sultan Kudarat. It also has a relay transmitter in Biaca Subd., Brgy. Poblacion, Tacurong.

References

Radio stations established in 1997